The University of Vic - Central University of Catalonia (UVic-UCC), is a Catalan university with premises in Vic, Manresa and Granollers. It is a privately managed institution, under public supervision through its proprietor, the Balmes University Foundation, whose chair is the Mayor of Vic. UVic-UCC is a higher education and research centre. The UVic-UCC is a member of the Vives University Network.

It was recognised as a university in 1997, fruit of the fusion of several centres in Vic affiliated to other universities. Initially, there was a campus only in Vic, but in 2014 the University of Vic was reconstituted as the University of Vic - Central University of Catalonia (UVic-UCC), as a result of the federation between the University of Vic and university centres in Manresa managed by the Bages University Foundation.

The emblem of the University of Vic is the A of Charlemagne, a Carolingian gold ornament symbolising the principles of learning and boundless expansion. The university lemma, Scientiae patriaeque impendere vitam, is a verse of Lucan that means "Devoting life to the service of science and the community".

History 
On 26 June 1599, Philip III of Spain granted permission for General Study activities in Vic and the privilege of graduating students in Art and Philosophy. Thus began the Literary University of Vic. In 1717, as a reprisal for the War of the Spanish Succession, Philip V suppressed all the Catalan universities, which had sided against him, and founded the University of Cervera in a Catalan city that had remained faithful to him. In 1749, the Vic Seminary for training priests was founded. In the 19th century Vic became a hub of cultural activity in the Catalan Renaixença., with figures of renown such as Jaume Balmes, Jacint Verdaguer and Jaume Collell, and institutions like the Episcopalian Library and Archive and the Literary Circle.

In 1873, the city council tried without success to re-establish the University of Vic. Finally during the Transition, the Jaume Balmes Teacher Training School, affiliated with the University of Barcelona was founded in 1977. The publishing house Eumo Editorial (EUMO is the Catalan acronym for University School of Teachers of Osona) was created in 1979 and the design studio Eumogràfic in 1984. The 1987–1988 academic year was the first of the Estudis Universitaris de Vic with three teaching centres: the Jaume Balmes Teacher Training School, the University School of Business Studies of Osona, affiliated with the University of Barcelona, and the Osona Nursing School, affiliated with the Autonomous University of Barcelona.

The Polytechnic School opened 1988, followed by the Faculty of Translation and Interpreting in 1993. In 1997, this group of centres merged into a new university, when the Parliament of Catalonia passed the Law for Recognition of the University of Vic on 21 May.

Rectors

Notable faculty 
 Segimon Serrallonga i Morer (1930–2002), philologist, poet and translator
 Joaquim Maideu i Puig (1932–1996), pedagogue and composer
 M. Antònia Canals i Tolosa (born 1930), teacher and mathematician

References

External links 
 
 UManresa
 BAU Centre University of Design (affiliated centre)
 EADA (affiliated centre)
 UVic video channel

Universities in Catalonia
1997 establishments in Catalonia
Educational institutions established in 1997
Vic